The 2022 Asian Wrestling Championships was the 35th edition of Asian Wrestling Championships of combined events, and took place from April 19 to 24 in Ulaanbaatar, Mongolia.

Medal table

Team ranking

Medal summary

Men's freestyle

Men's Greco-Roman

Women's freestyle

Participating nations 
250 competitors from 19 nations competed.

 (2)
 (30)
 (20)
 (30)
 (2)
 (30)
 (4)
 (21)
 (30)
 (3)
 (1)
 (1)
 (4)
 (25)
 (4)
 (2)
 (3)
 (8)
 (30)

References

External links 
 UWW Page
 Results Book

Asia
2022
Wrestling
International wrestling competitions hosted by Mongolia
Asian Wrestling Championships